Tsondol is a locality on the Etsin Col River in the west of Inner Mongolia. It is the type locality for the relict gull, a specimen of which was collected by Sven Hedin's expedition team on 24 April 1929.

References

Populated places in Inner Mongolia